Dunipace is a village in the west of the Falkirk council area of Scotland. The village is situated on the north bank of the River Carron and adjoins the town of Denny, to the south of the river. Dunipace is part of the historic county of Stirlingshire.

The main road through Dunipace is the A872 road between Denny and Stirling. Based on the 2001 census, Falkirk council reported the population of Dunipace as being 2,444 residents.

History
In 1983 a temporary Roman marching camp was found from aerial photographs just outside the town, north of the Carron. A stone bridge was built between Dunipace and Denny in the 1820s. In 1876 Dunipace was joined with Denny to form the Denny and Dunipace Burgh. This was abolished in 1975 when both areas became part of Falkirk District.

A legend exists that the famous Scottish patriot William Wallace, lived in Dunipace with his uncle, who was a clergyman at the parish church.

Amenities
Dunipace is mainly residential, and has a church, a primary school, a few shops (including two hairdressers) and two pubs: The Red Hoose and Bar 209 also an Indian Takeaway (Chilli Hut)

The Red Hoose was used as a filming location for hit Scottish comedy Still Game in the New Year's episode of 2007.

Sports
The local football team is Dunipace F.C. The club was formed in 1888 and is based at Westfield Park.

Notable residents
In the First World War 902 men signed up from Denny and Dunipace. Of those 154 were killed in action or died on service. Decorations were earned by 31 men.
Agnes Eleanora ("Nora") Miller FRSE (1898–1994) zoologist

See also
List of places in Falkirk council area

References

External links

Dunipace Parish Church
Dunipace Primary School

Villages in Falkirk (council area)
Denny, Falkirk